The family of Southeast Solomonic languages forms a branch of the Oceanic languages. It consists of some 26 languages covering the South East Solomon Islands, from the tip of Santa Isabel to Makira. The fact that there is little diversity amongst these languages, compared to groups of similar size in Melanesia, suggests that they dispersed in the relatively recent past. Bugotu and Gela are two of the most conservative languages.

Languages
According to Lynch, Ross, & Crowley (2002), the structure of the family is as follows:

Bugotu–Gela–Guadalcanal family 
Bughotu (Bugotu)
Gela–Guadalcanal family 
Gelic: Lengo, Gela
Guadalcanal: Birao, Ghari, Malango, Talise
Longgu–Malaita–Makira family 
Longgu
Malaita–Makira family 
Sa'a
Makira (San Cristobal): Arosi, Fagani, Bauro, Kahua–Owa, ?Marau Wawa
Malaita
Central–North Malaita: North (To'abaita, Baelelea, Baeggu, Fataleka), Lau, Kwara'ae, Wala, Gula'alaa, Kwaio, Dori'o
Southern Malaita: 'Are'are, Marau, Oroha

Basic vocabulary
Basic vocabulary in many Southeast Solomonic languages is somewhat conservative, unlike Northwest Solomonic forms, many of which have no Proto-Oceanic cognates. Below, Gela and Arosi are compared with three Northwest Solomonic languages. Aberrant forms are in bold.

{| 
! English !! arm !! ear !! liver !! bone !! skin !! louse
|-
| Proto-Oceanic ||  ||  ||  ||  ||  || 
|-
| Ririo ||  ||  ||  ||  ||  || 
|-
| Zabana ||  ||  ||  ||  ||  || 
|-
| Maringe ||  ||  ||  ||  ||  || 
|-
| Gela ||  ||  ||  ||  ||  || 
|-
| Arosi ||  ||  ||  ||  ||  || 
|}

References

Further reading
Tryon, Darrell T. and B. D. Hackman. 1983. Solomon Islands Languages: An Internal Classification. (Pacific Linguistics: Series C, 72.) Canberra: Research School of Pacific and Asian Studies, Australian National University

 
Central–Eastern Oceanic languages
Languages of the Solomon Islands